Edwige Pitel (born 4 June 1967) is a French racing cyclist, who most recently rode for UCI Women's Continental Team . Pitel was the winner of the 2003 ITU Duathlon World Championships.

Pitel earned a PhD from Imperial College London in 1994 under the supervision of Peter G. Harrison for a thesis titled Queues with negative customers.

Major results
Sources:

2001
 1st Chrono des Nations
2002
 National Road Championships
2nd Road race
3rd Time trial
2003
 National Road Championships
2nd Time trial
11th Road race
 1st  Overall Tour de Bretagne Féminin
2004
 National Road Championships
1st  Time trial
6th Road race
 1st Chrono des Nations
 4th Gran Premio Brissago Lago Maggiore
 6th GP de Plouay – Bretagne
2005
 National Road Championships
1st  Time trial
4th Road race
 1st  Overall Tour Féminin en Limousin
1st Stage 3b (ITT)
 1st Chrono des Nations
 2nd Overall Grande Boucle Féminine Internationale
1st Stage 3
 2nd Overall Trophée d'Or Féminin
 5th Souvenir Magali Pache Lausanne
 10th Overall Tour de l'Aude Cycliste Féminin
 10th GP de Plouay – Bretagne
2006
 2nd National Time trial Championships
 4th Souvenir Magali Pache Lausanne
 5th Ronde van Vlaanderen
 6th Chrono des Nations
 8th Overall Le Tour du Grand Montreal
 9th Gran Premio Castilla y Leon
 9th Montreal World Cup
2007
 National Road Championships
1st  Road race
3rd Time trial
 2nd Trophée des Grimpeurs
 3rd Overall Tour de Feminin-O cenu Českého Švýcarska
 4th Overall Tour de PEI
 5th Overall Vuelta Ciclista Femenina a El Salvador
 8th Overall Thüringen Rundfahrt der Frauen
 8th Overall Giro del Trentino Alto Adige-Südtirol
 9th Overall Tour de Berne
 9th Chrono des Nations
 10th Souvenir Magali Pache Lausanne
2008
 National Road Championships
3rd Road race
3rd Time trial
 2nd Overall Tour Féminin en Limousin
 3rd Overall Route de France Féminine
 3rd Overall Trophée d'Or Féminin
 4th Memorial Davide Fardelli (ITT)
 6th Overall Tour de Bretagne Féminin
 7th Chrono des Nations
 7th Prijs Stad Roeselare
 8th Overall Tour Cycliste Féminin International de l'Ardèche
2009
 National Road Championships
2nd Time trial
5th Road race
 2nd Overall Tour de Feminin-O cenu Českého Švýcarska
 2nd Trophée des Grimpeurs
 4th Memorial Davide Fardelli – Cronometro Individuale (ITT)
 5th Overall Tour de Bretagne Féminin
 5th Chrono des Nations
 7th Gran Premio Brissago Lago Maggiore
 9th Grand Prix de Suisse (ITT)
2010
 National Road Championships
2nd Time trial
5th Road race
 3rd Overall Tour Féminin en Limousin
 3rd Chrono des Nations (ITT)
 8th Grand Prix de Suisse (ITT)
2011
 5th National Time trial Championships
 10th Chrono Gatineau (ITT)
2012
 1st Memorial Davide Fardelli – Cronometro Individuale (ITT)
 3rd National Time trial Championships
 3rd Chrono des Nations (ITT)
 6th Overall La Route de France
 10th Overall Tour de Bretagne Féminin
2013
 National Road Championships
6th Time trial
9th Road race
 3rd Overall Tour Féminin en Limousin
 5th Chrono des Nations (ITT)
 7th Overall Tour Languedoc Roussillon
 9th Overall Gracia–Orlová
2014
 2nd Giro dell'Emilia Internazionale Donne Elite
 3rd Overall Tour Cycliste Féminin International de l'Ardèche
 4th Chrono des Nations (ITT)
 5th National Time trial Championships
 6th Grand Prix de Plumelec-Morbihan Dames
 9th Overall Premondiale Giro Toscana Int. Femminile
 10th Overall Gracia–Orlová
2015
 2nd Overall Trophée d'Or Féminin
 2nd Frauen Grand Prix Gippingen
 4th National Time trial Championships
 7th Overall Premondiale Giro Toscana Int. Femminile
 7th Giro dell'Emilia Internazionale Donne Elite
 10th Chrono des Nations (ITT)
2016
 National Road Championships
1st  Road race
2nd Time trial
 3rd Overall Tour Cycliste Féminin International de l'Ardèche
1st  Points classification
1st Stage 5 (ITT)
 4th Overall Giro del Trentino Alto Adige-Südtirol
2017
 5th Chrono des Nations (ITT)
2018
 4th Overall Tour of the Gila
1st  Mountain classification
 5th Overall Joe Martin Stage Race
 8th Chrono des Nations (ITT)
2019
 5th Overall Tour of the Gila
 9th Overall Colorado Classic
 9th Winston-Salem Cycling Classic
 10th Chrono des Nations (ITT)

References

External links
 
 
 

1967 births
Living people
French female cyclists
Duathletes
People from Dinan
Alumni of the Department of Computing, Imperial College London
Cyclists at the 2004 Summer Olympics
Olympic cyclists of France
Sportspeople from Côtes-d'Armor
Cyclists from Brittany